Tokyo Jukebox 2 is the tenth studio album by the American guitarist Marty Friedman. Similar to the first cover album Tokyo Jukebox, this album is a collection of instrumental covers of Japanese songs, produced and arranged by Marty Friedman himself.

Track listing

References

 "Tokyo Jukebox, Vols. 1-2 - Marty Friedman"

2011 albums
Marty Friedman albums
Covers albums